The 1981 German Open Championships was a men's tennis tournament played on outdoor clay courts at Am Rothenbaum in Hamburg, West Germany that was part of the Super Series of the 1981 Grand Prix circuit. It was the 73rd edition of the event and took place from 11 May until 17 May 1981. Sixth-seeded Peter McNamara won the singles title after a win against first-seeded Jimmy Connors in a rain-interrupted final that was played over two days.

Finals

Singles
 Peter McNamara defeated  Jimmy Connors, 7–6, 6–1, 4–6, 6–4
 It was McNamara' 1st singles title of the year and the 3rd of his career.

Doubles
 Andrés Gómez /  Hans Gildemeister defeated  Peter McNamara /  Paul McNamee, 6–4, 3–6, 6–4

References

External links
   
 ATP tournament profile
 ITF tournament edition details

German Open
Hamburg European Open
1981 in West German sport
German